"Girl of My Dreams" is a song by American rapper and singer Rod Wave, and the sixth single from his second studio album Pray 4 Love, appearing on the deluxe edition.

Background and composition
As the title suggests, Rod Wave melodically fantasizes about the woman of his dreams, sing-rapping about what he sees in her. The instrumental of the song, produced by Ace Lex, contains a sample of "Bullet" by Tula.

Music video
The music video was released on May 3, 2020. It features Rod Wave in his bedroom daydreaming about a woman he loves, and a silhouette of a beautiful African-American woman appears in the visual as well.

Charts

Weekly charts

Year-end charts

Certifications

References

2020 singles
2020 songs
Rod Wave songs
Universal Music Group singles